Killiecrankie Airstrip (IATA: - , ICAO: YKCK) is a small regional airstrip located in the north of Flinders Island in Killiecrankie, Tasmania.

See also 

 List of airports in Tasmania

References 
Flinders Island
Airports in Tasmania